Robert Lance Markram  (15 September 1975 – 6 July 2001) was a South African rugby union player.

Playing career
Markram matriculated at Kathu High School in the Northern Cape.

Markram toured with the Springboks to Britain and Ireland in 1998. He did not play in any test matches for the Springboks but played in four tour matches.

Markram died on 6 July 2001 in a motor vehicle accident on the road between Kimberley and Barkly West.

See also
List of South Africa national rugby union players – Springbok no. 677

References

1975 births
2001 deaths
South African rugby union players
South Africa international rugby union players
Griquas (rugby union) players
Western Province (rugby union) players
Boland Cavaliers players
Stormers players
Rugby union players from the Northern Cape
Rugby union wings